Chief of Air Staff is the official title of the highest ranking air force personnel of the Ghana Air Force. The current Chief of Air Staff is Air Vice Marshal Frank Hanson.

Chiefs of Air Staff
The senior appointment in the GHF is the Chief of Air Staff. The following is a list of the Ghana Air Force Chiefs of Air Staff:

References

Ghanaian military personnel

Ghana
Ghanaian Heads of Security Services